August Heinrich Simon (29 October 180516 August 1860) was a German democratic politician.

External links
 
 Heinrich Simon at the Swiss Literary Archives
 
 
 August Heinrich Simon in the Simon section of the Meyers Konversations-Lexikon from 1880
 Simon Papers at the John Rylands Library, University of Manchester
 The Heinrich Simon Monument (in German) at Ortsgemeinde Murg
 Dr. Heinrich Simon (in German), a supplement to "Der Freie Oberländer" Bad Ragaz, 2 September 1960, No. 103 

1805 births
1860 deaths
Members of the Frankfurt Parliament
Politicians from Wrocław